Aberdeen F.C. competed in Scottish Football League Division One and Scottish Cup in season 1910–11.

Overview

This was Aberdeen's eighth season overall and their sixth successive season in the top flight of Scottish football. The team finished in their highest league position to date, second behind champions Rangers. In the Scottish Cup, they lost in the semi-final to Celtic. New additions to the team included forward Pat Travers, who later went on to manage the club. Angus McIntosh finished as the club's top scorer with 17 goals in both competitions.

Results

Scottish Division One

Final standings

Scottish Cup

Squad

Appearances & Goals

|}

References

Aberdeen F.C. seasons
Aberdeen